Stelvio House on Bassaleg Road, Newport, Wales was the home of Charles Henry Bailey, the important 19th century industrialist and published author. It was spot listed on 20 March 1996 by Cadw, Welsh Historic Monuments in recognition of its architectural and historic importance but developers McCarthy & Stone were fined £200,000, plus costs of £13,000, for subsequently demolishing what was one of Newport’s most important historic buildings. At the time, it was the largest fine recorded by The Institute of Historic Building Conservation.

There were large formal gardens surrounding the house, including a large fishpond and an outdoor swimming pool. The rock and water gardens, which became the gardens of 15 and 17 Stow Park Circle, are listed at Grade II on the Cadw/ICOMOS Register of Parks and Gardens of Special Historic Interest in Wales.

References

Newport, Wales
Registered historic parks and gardens in Newport